Dave Harris (born  February 25, 1971) is an American disc jockey, songwriter and musician.

He was born in Glasgow, Kentucky, United States, and hosted the syndicated radio show Retro Rewind in 1999. Harris created Retro Rewind in October 1997. In 1998 Harris briefly took a leave of absence from Retro Rewind to manage the band The Outfield.

Harris is also a songwriter, having penned a Top 20 hit on the Billboard magazine adult contemporary charts in April 2005 called "Sunset Blvd".

Harris has also lent his songwriting talent to others. He has co-written songs with  Rob Thomas, Jon Secada, Julian Lennon, Michael J. Willett, Rick Springfield, John Waite, Billy Burnette, Scott Grimes, Adam Jensen and Billy Montana.

In 2015, Harris formed The Dave Harris Project (featuring Michael J. Willett on vocals) which released the album Grandiose Delusions.

In January 2017, Harris was charged with 27 felony counts involving statutory rape and especially aggravated sexual exploitation of a minor. He was convicted of those charges in April 2018.

References

External links

Retro Rewind official site

1971 births
American radio DJs
Living people
American male musicians
People from Glasgow, Kentucky
Songwriters from Kentucky
American male songwriters